Hakan Köseoğlu (born December 12, 1981 in İstanbul, Turkey) is a Turkish former professional basketball player. He played the point guard position.

External links
 TBLStat.net Profile

1981 births
Living people
2002 FIBA World Championship players
Aliağa Petkim basketball players
Darüşşafaka Basketbol players
Karşıyaka basketball players
Kepez Belediyesi S.K. players
Maroussi B.C. players
Mersin Büyükşehir Belediyesi S.K. players
Point guards
Tofaş S.K. players
Tuborg Pilsener basketball players
Turkish expatriate basketball people
Turkish expatriate basketball people in Greece
Turkish men's basketball players